William Martingell (20 August 1818 – 29 September 1897), also known as Will Martingell, was an English professional cricketer who played first-class cricket between 1839 and 1860. He played primarily for Kent County Cricket Club and Surrey County Cricket Club, making over 180 first-class appearances during his career.

Early life
Martingell was born at Nutfield in Surrey in 1818, the eldest child of Russell Martingell and his wife Sarah. His father was a shoemaker who played one first-class match for a Surrey team in 1828 and who had a reputation as a good fast underarm bowler. Martingell learned the trade of shoemaking from his father and also worked as a gamekeeper.

Cricket career
Martingell is first recorded as a cricketer in July 1839, playing for Lingfield Cricket Club against Montpelier Cricket Club in a match at Dormansland. A report in the Sussex Agricultural Express called his bowling "splendid" and reported that he was a "most promising" cricketer who was due to be employed at the Marylebone Cricket Club (MCC). He made his first-class cricket debut later the same month playing for a Surrey side against MCC at Lord's, taking five wickets in the MCC second innings as they were dismissed for 15 runs.

After being unable to find sponsorship to play as a professional at MCC or in Surrey, Martingell moved to Kent in 1841 and was "engaged" working under Fuller Pilch at Canterbury. Pilch, who was one of the leading cricketers of the time, had managed the Old County Ground at Town Malling before moving to do the same at the Beverley Ground at Canterbury. Under Pilch's tuition Martingell quickly became established as one of the best professionals playing at the time and played for Kent, both before and after the formation of the first county club in 1842, and in matches at Lord's for a variety of sides. In 1844 he was employed by the Earl of Ducie at Woodchester Park in Gloucestershire and played for West of England teams four times in two years.

In 1846 Martingell was one of the first two professionals to be employed by the newly formed Surrey County Cricket Club at The Oval, Dulcie having sold his property in Gloucestershire. He played for both Kent and Surrey until 1852 and, as a professional, turned out for a wide variety of other sides: MCC, England sides, William Clarke's All-England Eleven and played in 12 Gentlemen v Players matches between 1844 and 1858. He made his last appearance for Kent in 1854 and for Surrey in 1859, with his final first-class matches in 1860 being played for MCC.

In total Martingell played in 182 first-class matches, 49 of which were for Kent and 49 for Surrey. He was considered one of the best professional players of his era, with both his batting and bowling considered to "rank high", although his bowling was his greater strength. The Sporting Review of 1846 considered him "a most excellent player, and a thoroughly well-conducted man". He was considered a "fine judge of the game" and held many coaching appointments, including at Bradfield College, Rugby School and Eton College. A benefit match held for him at The Oval in 1860 raised over £260.

Personal life
Martingell married Caroline Evans at Monks Kirby in Warwickshire in 1850. He was known by the nickname "Grannie" and died at Eton Wick in Buckinghamshire in September 1897 aged 79.

References

External links

1818 births
1897 deaths
English cricketers
English cricketers of 1826 to 1863
People from Nutfield, Surrey
All-England Eleven cricketers
Kent cricketers
Surrey cricketers
Players cricketers
Hampshire cricketers
Marylebone Cricket Club cricketers
North v South cricketers
Surrey Club cricketers
Married v Single cricketers
West of England cricketers
Non-international England cricketers
Gentlemen of England cricketers